Farmen VIP is the second season of the celebrity version of the TV4 reality series The Farm. After season one of Farmen VIP. Presenter is Paolo Roberto. It premieres on 11 March 2019.

Contestants 
 Amir Akrouti, youtuber
 Frank Andersson, wrestler
 Sigrid Bernson, singer and dancer
 Felicia Book, influencer (Left due to injury, Episode 1)
 Dogge Doggelito, singer
 Per Fosshaug, bandyplayer
 Regina Lund, actress and singer
 Vlad Reiser, youtuber and singer
 Anna Sahlene, singer
 Saga Scott, reality star

References

External links 
 
 

TV4 (Sweden) original programming
2019 Swedish television seasons
2019_Swedish_television_series_debuts
2019_Swedish_television_series_endings
The Farm (franchise)